Edwin Huitson Blackburn (18 April 1957 – 20 April 2018) was an English footballer who played as a goalkeeper. He played in the Football League for Hull City, York City and Hartlepool United, before he finished his career in the Swedish Allsvenskan with Halmstads BK.

Career
Born in Houghton-le-Spring, County Durham, Blackburn started his career with Hull City as an apprentice in February 1973 before signing a professional contract in September 1974. He made 75 appearances for Hull in all competitions before becoming Barry Lyons' first signing for York City for a fee of £5,750 in April 1980. He finished his first season at the club being named Clubman of the Year as York finished bottom of the Fourth Division. After York signed Roger Jones in the summer of 1982 he joined Hartlepool United on loan in December, before joining the club permanently in January 1983. He finished his career in Sweden on loan to Halmstads BK after that club's first-choice goalkeeper injured his knee.

Career statistics

Footnotes

A.  The "League" column constitutes appearances and goals (including those as a substitute) in the Football League and Allsvenskan.
B.  The "Other" column constitutes appearances and goals (including those as a substitute) in the Football League Trophy.

References

1957 births
2018 deaths
People from Houghton-le-Spring
Footballers from Tyne and Wear
English footballers
Association football goalkeepers
Hull City A.F.C. players
York City F.C. players
Hartlepool United F.C. players
Halmstads BK players
English Football League players
Allsvenskan players
English expatriate footballers
Expatriate footballers in Sweden